Licoma Pampa Municipality is the sixth municipal section of the Inquisivi Province in the  La Paz Department, Bolivia. Its seat is Licoma.

References 

 Instituto Nacional de Estadistica de Bolivia

Municipalities of La Paz Department (Bolivia)